GasBuddy is a tech company based in Boston that operates apps and websites based on finding real-time fuel prices at more than 140,000 gas stations in the United States and Canada. They also sell software products to convenience store owners via their B2B initiatives (formerly known OpenStore).

The GasBuddy app is a GPS-based application for smartphones and tablets which provides prices of nearby gas stations from user-submitted data, as well as through partnerships with other companies and directly from station operators. The app has  Android, BlackBerry 10, and iOS versions.

The app also includes GasBuddy's partnerships with Wex (called "Pay with Gasbuddy") and ParkWhiz for parking.

History
Childhood friends Dustin Coupal (an ophthalmologist) and Jason Toews (a computer programmer from Saskatchewan) founded GasBuddy in June 2000 in Minneapolis. Toews and Coupal launched the collection of GasBuddy websites as a way for consumers to share gas-pricing information. They filed as a Minnesota for-profit corporation in April 2004 as GasBuddy Organization Inc.

In 2009, GasBuddy launched OpenStore with its first convenience store partner, Rutter's, by building the Rutter's app and supporting digital marketing efforts through its custom platform.

Towards the end of 2010, GasBuddy launched its own set of apps that allowed users to input prices via their smartphones.

In March 2013, UCG, a privately held, business-to-business company headquartered in Rockville, Maryland, announced that Oil Price Information Service (OPIS) had acquired GasBuddy. OPIS is a UCG subsidiary established in 1977 as the Oil Express Newsletter and specializing in worldwide petroleum pricing and news for businesses.

On February 10, 2016, IHS acquired OPIS, separating from GasBuddy, which remained with UCG as a subsidiary company. This was also the point that several key features were removed, reducing the "sense of community," especially the awards given for challenges to reach certain milestones and the "whiteboards" - a chat room only for registered users. 

Initially only available in the United States and Canada, GasBuddy launched in Australia in March 2016.

On September 12, 2016, GasBuddy released a completely redesigned app available for iOS and Android devices, the first major redesign of the app since its release in 2010. GasBuddy also unveiled a new logo and launched GasBuddy Business Pages.

On August 28, 2017, GasBuddy launched a gas savings program, Pay with GasBuddy, that lets consumers save at gas stations in the United States.

Overview
GasBuddy operates an app and websites for the public to report and see prices of motor fuel in the United States, Canada, and Australia. Users report motor fuel prices in their area, which is made available to other visitors. Each entry is timestamped. Data on the website and in app is provided by spotters, stations, and relationships with credit card companies.

Its website offers additional features such as a fuel log book, which allows users to record fuel purchases, odometer miles, and fuel usage.

References

External links
 

Comparison shopping websites
Petroleum economics
Application software
American companies established in 2000
Privately held companies based in Massachusetts